Billy Wilhelm (June 11, 1929 – December 24, 2010) was an American college baseball coach who was the head coach of the Clemson Tigers from 1958 to 1993.  In his 36 seasons as head coach, Wilhelm had a record of 1,161–536–10.  Before coming to Clemson, Wilhelm played several seasons of minor league baseball and served one season as an assistant baseball coach at North Carolina.

Playing career
Wilhelm played two seasons of college baseball at NC State, and he signed a professional contract with the St. Louis Cardinals organization in 1950, splitting that season between the Goldsboro Cardinals and the Allentown Cardinals.  Wilhelm then spent two years out of baseball from 1951 to 1952, when he served in the United States Army in the Korean War.

In 1953, Wilhelm returned from military service and had his most successful minor league season.  In 96 games with the Paducah Chiefs of the Class D Kentucky–Illinois–Tennessee League, he batted .291 and hit 14 home runs.  After the 1954 season, which he split between the Columbus Cardinals and the Allentown Cardinals, Wilhelm left the Cardinals organization.

Wilhelm played the 1955 and 1956 seasons in the Milwaukee Braves system, advancing as high as the Double-A Atlanta Crackers.  He played his final season of professional baseball in summer 1957, with the Greensboro Patriots of the Boston Red Sox organization.

He appeared in a total of 401 minor league games, hitting .212 with 21 home runs.

Coaching career
Prior to his final season of professional baseball in summer 1957, Wilhelm had served as an assistant baseball coach for the North Carolina Tar Heels in spring 1957.  In September 1957, Wilhelm accepted the head coaching position at Clemson.

In his first two seasons, Wilhelm led the program to two Atlantic Coast Conference (ACC) championships and its first two College World Series appearances, in 1958 and 1959.  In the next 13 season (1960–1972), however, Clemson made only one NCAA Tournament appearance, in 1967.

With the start of the ACC Tournament era in 1973, Wilhelm began a stretch of 11 regular season conference championships in 13 seasons (through 1985), including seven consecutive from 1973–1979.  This 13-season period included three College World Series appearances, in 1976, 1977, and 1980.

From 1986–1993, the final eight seasons of Wilhelm's head coaching career, Clemson won three regular season conference championships (1988, 1991, 1992), three conference tournament championships (1989, 1991, and 1993), and one College World Series appearance (1991).

Wilhelm's teams had winning records in each of his 36 seasons, and he won a total of 17 ACC Regular Season Championships and seven ACC Tournament Championships, both ACC coaching records, as of the end of the 2012 season.  He also appeared in six College World Series.  He coached 27 players who went on to play Major League Baseball.

Head coaching record
The following is a table of Wilhelm's yearly records as an NCAA head baseball coach.

Death and posthumous awards
Wilhelm died at the age of 81 on December 24, 2010, in Seneca, South Carolina.  Following his death, he was inducted into the National College Baseball Hall of Fame in 2011 and the South Carolina Athletic Hall of Fame in 2012.

See also
List of college baseball coaches with 1,100 wins

Notes

References

1929 births
2010 deaths
Baseball catchers
Albany Cardinals players
Allentown Cardinals players
Atlanta Crackers players
Clemson Tigers baseball coaches
Columbus Cardinals players
Greensboro Patriots players
Jacksonville Braves players
NC State Wolfpack baseball players
North Carolina Tar Heels baseball coaches
Paducah Chiefs players
National College Baseball Hall of Fame inductees
Catawba College alumni
United States Army personnel of the Korean War